Lac de Seedorf (also: Seedorfsee) is a lake at Seedorf in the municipality of Noréaz, Canton of Fribourg, Switzerland.

Lakes of Switzerland
Lakes of the canton of Fribourg